Alvar Thiel (23 February 1893 – 1 October 1973) was born in Farsta, Stockholm, Stockholm, Sweden. He is famous for being a Swedish sailor who competed in the 1912 Summer Olympics. He was a crew member of the Swedish boat Sans Atout, which won the silver medal in the 8 metre class.

References

External links
profile

1893 births
1973 deaths
Swedish male sailors (sport)
Sailors at the 1912 Summer Olympics – 8 Metre
Olympic sailors of Sweden
Olympic silver medalists for Sweden
Olympic medalists in sailing
Medalists at the 1912 Summer Olympics